Vysočina is a municipality in Chrudim District in the Pardubice Region of the Czech Republic. It has about 700 inhabitants.

Administrative parts

Vysočina is made up of villages of Dřevíkov, Možděnice, Petrkov 1.díl, Rváčov, Svatý Mikuláš, Svobodné Hamry and Veselý Kopec.

Notable people
Jan Nevole (1812–1903), architect; lived here in 1863–1903

References

External links

 

Villages in Chrudim District